Melaka International College of Science and Technology (MiCoST) is a college in Malacca, Malaysia.

Founded in 2006, MiCoST is belong to State Government of Melaka and is run by the Melaka State Foundation (Yayasan Melaka) under its subsidiary company, YM Mediscience Sdn Bhd.

MiCoST has diplomas programs in management, information Technology, health science and early childhood education. 

Started from 2021 , Micost also offer Sijil Kemahiran Malaysia (SKM) Operasi Sistem Komputer Level 3 for those who not qualify for diploma after SPM.

Background 
MiCoST began its operation in 2006 with the Diploma in Pharmacy program in cooperation with MARA University of Technology (UiTM). Students are awarded diplomas by UiTM upon the completion of the three-year program.

In 2010, MiCoST added diploma programs in Pharmacy, Human Resource Management, Office Management, Business Management, Accountancy.

In 2011, MiCoST became the Asia e-University's (AeU) learning centre for  Melaka, Negeri Sembilan and Johor. That same year, MiCoST began a partnership with Cyberjaya University College of Medical Sciences (CUCMS).

In November 2014, MiCoST established the Faculty of Information Technology and  Multimedia. This faculty offered five new programmes

 Game Design
 Graphic Design, 
 Interactive Media, 
 Digital Animation
 Computer Science (Open Source Computing)

In 2016, MiCoST added four diploma programmes in partnership with UiTM:  Business Studies, Science, Pre-Diploma Science & Pre-Diploma Perdagangan.

Courses

Pre-diploma 
 SCIENCE (UiTM COLLABORATION)
 COMMERCE (UiTM COLLABORATION)

Diploma 

 SCIENCE (UiTM COLLABORATION)
 PHARMACY (UiTM COLLABORATION)
 PHARMACY (MiCoST)
 PSYCHOLOGY (UoC COLLABORATION)
 OCCUPATIONAL SAFETY AND HEALTH (UoC COLLABORATION)
 BUSINESS STUDIES
 ACCOUNTANCY
 OFFICE MANAGEMENT
 BUSINESS STUDIES (UiTM COLLABORATION)
 HUMAN RESOURCE MANAGEMENT
 PUBLIC ADMINISTRATION
 DIGITAL ANIMATION 
 GAME DESIGN
 GRAPHIC DESIGN
 INTERACTIVE MEDIA
 COMPUTER SCIENCE (OPEN SOURCE COMPUTING)

DOCTORATE 
 BUSINESS ADMINISTRATION (DBA)

University Partners 

 University Teknologi MARA (UiTM)
 University of Cyberjaya (UoC)
 Asia e University (AEU)
 Saito University College
 Mahsa University

See also
 List of universities in Malaysia

References

External links
 

Colleges in Malaysia
Universities and colleges in Malacca
Educational institutions established in 2006
2006 establishments in Malaysia